The Diving competition in the 2005 Summer Universiade were held in İzmir, Turkey.

Medal overview

Men's events

Women's events

Medal table

References
 

2005 Summer Universiade
Universiade
2005